Kristian Hefte (April 28, 1905 – February 24, 1977) was a Norwegian actor.

Hefte made his stage debut in 1929 at the Falkberget Theater as Fredrik in the play Bør Børson Jr. For more than thirty years, he was a driving force at the Trøndelag Theater, where he played such diverse roles as Celius in Nils Kjær's Det lykkelige valg, Didrik in Olav Duun's Medmenneske, and Firs in Anton Chekhov's The Cherry Orchard.

Hefte received the King's Medal of Merit in gold in 1975.

Filmography
 1932: Skjærgårdsflirt as Erik Østerman, Østerman's son
 1938: Bør Børson Jr. as Nils Tollvollen
 1939: De vergeløse as the sheriff's officer
 1940: Bastard as Vasily's Russian friend
 1941: Den forsvundne pølsemaker as the butcher's friend Rudolf Jensen
 1942: Trysil-Knut as a raftsman

References

External links
 
 Kristian Hefte at the Swedish Film Database
 Kristian Hefte at Sceneweb
 Kristian Hefte at Filmfront

1905 births
1977 deaths
Norwegian male stage actors
Norwegian male film actors
20th-century Norwegian male actors
People from Ål
Recipients of the King's Medal of Merit in gold